Khanjari (also Romanized as Khanjarī; also known as Ḩanjarī-ye Pā’īn, Khanjarī Soflá, and Khanjarī-ye Pā’īn) is a village in Sahra Rural District, Anabad District, Bardaskan County, Razavi Khorasan Province, Iran. At the 2006 census, its population was 104, in 29 families.

References 

Populated places in Bardaskan County